Recommendation may refer to:

 European Union recommendation, in international law
 Letter of recommendation, in employment or academia
 W3C recommendation, in Internet contexts
 A computer-generated recommendation created by a recommender system